Jingzhou Shashi Airport  is an airport in Shashi District of Jingzhou, in Hubei province of central China. The airport opened on January 30, 2021.

Airlines and destinations

See also
List of airports in China

References

Airports in Hubei